Tibshelf Community School is a mixed secondary school located in Tibshelf in the English county of Derbyshire.

It is a community school administered by Derbyshire County Council, and serves a catchment area of nine villages located across the districts of Bolsover and North East Derbyshire. They include Blackwell, Newton, Heath, Hilcote, Holmewood, Morton, Pilsley, Tibshelf and Westhouses.

Tibshelf Community School offers GCSEs and BTECs as programmes of study for pupils. The school relocated to new buildings during 2014.

Notable alumni
Sophie Baggaley - Association football goalkeeper who plays for Birmingham City L.F.C. and has represented England at under 23 level, attended Tibshelf Community School from 2008 to 2013.

References

External links
Tibshelf Community School official website

Secondary schools in Derbyshire
Community schools in Derbyshire